Clara Høgh-Poulsen (born 26 May 1998) is a Danish handball player who currently plays for Viborg HK.

References

1998 births
Living people
Danish female handball players
21st-century Danish women